Yada (written: 矢田 or 谷田) is a Japanese surname. Notable people with the surname include:

Akiko Yada (born 1978), Japanese actress
Asahi Yada (born 1991), Japanese footballer
, Japanese high jumper
Kōji Yada (born 1933), Japanese voice actor
Lena Yada (born 1978), Japanese-American model, actress, and surfer
Minoru Yada (born 1931), Japanese voice actor
, Japanese sport wrestler
Tatsuo Yada (born 1940), mayor of Kobe, Japan
Yusuke Yada (born 1983), Japanese footballer

Fictional characters
, a character in the Assassination Classroom anime and manga

See also
 "The Yada Yada", an episode of Seinfeld

Japanese-language surnames